Omega Township is one of twenty-one current townships in Carroll County, Arkansas, USA. As of the 2010 census, its total population was 418. As of the 2010 census, the population of Carroll County was 27,446

Geography

References
 United States Census Bureau 2008 TIGER/Line Shapefiles
 United States Board on Geographic Names (GNIS)
 United States National Atlas

 Census 2010 U.S. Gazetteer Files: County Subdivisions in Arkansas

External links
 US-Counties.com
 City-Data.com

Townships in Carroll County, Arkansas
Townships in Arkansas